Aurelio Nuño Mayer  is a Mexican politician. He served as the Mexican Minister of Public Education during August 2015 to December 2017.

Aurelio Nuño received a degree in political science and administration at the Universidad Iberoamericana, and he later earned a master's degree at University of Oxford (UK).

Before working for the Mexican Government, Nuño was an advisor to Peña Nieto in governing the State of Mexico and coordinator of dissemination and marketing of his presidential campaign. Nuño was coordinator of the advisers to recent Secretary of the Treasury, Luis Videgaray, but when he was chairman of the Budget and Public Account Committee in the chamber of deputies.

References

Living people
Alumni of St Antony's College, Oxford
21st-century Mexican politicians
Honorary Knights Commander of the Order of the British Empire
1978 births
Mexican Secretaries of Education